Santhanam is a 1955 Indian Telugu-language drama film, produced & directed by C. V. Ranganatha Das under the Sadhana Films  banner while  L. V. Prasad has taken care of direction supervision. It stars Akkineni Nageswara Rao and Savitri, with music composed by Susarla Dakshina Murthy. The film is the debut of legendary singer Lata Mangeshkar in the Telugu film industry. The song Nidura Pora Thammuda was a trend setter in being a theme song that unites lost siblings. The film was remade in Tamil as Marakka Mudiyuma?.

Plot 
The film begins on Rangaiah (S. V. Ranga Rao) a worker who has two children and his wife passes-away giving birth to a third. Beyond that, Rangaiah loses his eyesight in an accident and 3 children are left to fend for themselves by Rangaiah. Due to misfortune, the second one Ramu is lost on the train and joins in a drama troupe. the eldest Lakshmi finds shelter at the rich man Narahari Rao's (Mikkilineni) residence, with the help of his son Madhu. One day, unfortunately, the younger Babu is abducted by a thief for a locket when Mastan Baba, a wrestler rescues and rears him. Years roll by, Ramu (Akkineni Nageswara Rao) becomes a stage artist and his proprietor wants to forcibly couple up his daughter with him. Frightened Ramu escapes and lands at a millionaire Subbaraju's (Relangi) house where he is appointed as a cook and Sarada (Savitri) the daughter of Subbaraju falls for him. Parallelly, Madhu (Amarnath) & Lakshmi (Sriranjani Jr) share a bond beyond a causal relation, one to one and he promises to marry her soon after his return from abroad. Knowing it, Narahari necks her out. On the other side, before dying, Mastan Baba reveals Babu (Chalam) his birth secret and handovers the locket. After that, he saves Narahari's daughter Sarala (Kusuma Kumari) from goons and they also love each other. Here Narahari angers as he aspires to perform Sarala's espousal with his nephew Shakaram (Padmanabham), so, he separates them too.

Meanwhile, Subbaraju learns regarding the love affair of Ramu & Sarada and gives approval for their alliance and promotes Ramu as General Manager. After return, Madhu finds out his father's violation of Lakshmi. Right now, she works as a daily worker at Subbaraju's factory where Manager Kamayya (Ramana Reddy) tries to molest her when Babu rescues. In the quarrel, she recognizes him by the locket. Thereafter, to take avenge, Kamayya throws Lakshmi into debts and asks her to vacate the house. So, to repay the amount Babu makes a heist from a beggar who is Rangaiah when Lakshmi chides Babu and gives it back to Rangaiah. Due to unknown bondage, Lakshmi brings him home. During that plight, Lakshmi moves for Ramu's help but he leaves reluctantly. Depressed Lakshmi moves on singing their childhood song when Ramu recognizes her. So, he rushes behind, pleads pardon and narrates their story. At that point in time, Rangaiah realizes them as his children but keeps quiet out of contrition. At the same time, Babu arrives as he misinterprets, tries to hit Ramu when, unfortunately, Lakshmi is wounded. Immediately, she is admitted to a hospital where Madhu is the doctor. Accidentally, Babu spots grief-stricken Sarala there and makes her normal. Discerning the situation, Subbaraju silently arranges the weddings of siblings. Being cognizant of it, Narahari reaches the venue when Rangaiah obstructs his way. In the emotion, he reveals the truth where the children associated with their father. Looking at their affection Narahari also realizes. Finally, the movie ends on a happy note with the marriages of siblings with their respective love interests.

Cast 
Akkineni Nageswara Rao as Ramu/Krishna
Savitri as Sharada
S. V. Ranga Rao as Rangaiah
Chalam as Babu
Amarnath as Madhu
Relangi as Subba Raju
Ramana Reddy as Manager
Mikkilineni as Narahari Rao
Chadalavada as Subbaiah
Allu Ramalingaiah as Lingaiah
Padmanabham as Shankaram
Sriranjani Jr. as Lakshmi
Kusuma Kumari as Sarala
Hemalatha as Ravamma

Soundtrack 

Music composed by Susarla Dakshina Murthy. Lyrics were written by Anisetty & Pinisetty. Music released on Audio Company.

Tamil songs

Tamil version 
The film was dubbed into Tamil with the same title and released in 1956. Dialogues were written by Thanjai T. K. Govindan and the lyrics were penned by Kuyilan.

References

External links 
 

1950s Telugu-language films
Indian drama films
Films scored by Susarla Dakshinamurthi
Telugu films remade in other languages
1955 drama films
Indian black-and-white films